Chopt Creative Salad Company is an American chain of fast casual restaurants with over 70 locations in New York City, Washington, D.C., Maryland, Connecticut, New Jersey, Virginia, North Carolina, Georgia, and Tennessee. The company was founded in 2001 and serves salads, warm grain bowls, and sandwich wraps.

Fare 
According to the company, no sugar is used in any of their salad dressings. Agave nectar and honey are used as replacements in sweet dressings. In addition to salads, "salad sandwiches" are also available , which are essentially salads wrapped in tortillas.

Food preparation 
A long bar is present at every restaurant, with three stations occupying the bar. The first is where customers order their salad or salad-sandwich. The second is where the food is chopped with a mezzaluna knife then dressed.  The third is the cashier, where customers go to pay.

References 

 The Washington Post
 The Wall Street Journal
 New York Magazine
 CBS New York
 QSR Magazine 
 Slate.

External links 
 Chopt website

Fast casual restaurants
Restaurant chains in the United States
Restaurants established in 2001
American companies established in 2001